Yablochnoye is a rural locality (a selo) and the administrative center of Yablochenskoye Urban Settlement, Khokholsky District, Voronezh Oblast, Russia. The population was 744 as of 2010. There are 19 streets.

Geography 
Yablochnoye is located 44 km southeast of Khokholsky (the district's administrative centre) by road. Oskino is the nearest rural locality.

References 

Rural localities in Khokholsky District